Prostanthera discolor is a species of flowering plant in the family Lamiaceae and is endemic to a small area of New South Wales. It is an open, erect, strongly aromatic shrub with lance-shaped to oblong leaves, and deep mauve to purple flowers with darker spots inside.

Description
Flowering occurs from September to October.

Taxonomy and naming
Prostanthera discolor was first formally described in 1896 by Richard Thomas Baker in Proceedings of the Linnean Society of New South Wales.

Distribution and habitat
This mint bush grows in forest in gullies, often in rocky sites in the Sandy Hollow–Merriwa district.

Conservation status
This mintbush is listed as "vulnerable" under the Australian Government Environment Protection and Biodiversity Conservation Act 1999 and the New South Wales Government Biodiversity Conservation Act 2016. In the year 2000, the entire population of the species was estimated to be 110 individuals. The main threats to the species include eutrophication of nearby streams, grazing by goats and the species' small population size.

References

discolor
Flora of New South Wales
Lamiales of Australia
Plants described in 1896
Taxa named by Richard Thomas Baker